Galeopsis, commonly called hemp-nettle or hempnettle, is a genus of annual herbaceous plants native to Europe and Asia. Some species are naturalized in North America and New Zealand.

The plants are poisonous. Several species are widespread weeds and some are used as medicinal herbs.

Species
Species include:
 Galeopsis × acuminata Rchb. - Germany (G. pubescens × G. tetrahit)
 Galeopsis bifida Boenn. – bifid hemp-nettle, split-lip hemp-nettle, splitlip hempnettle, common hemp-nettle, and large-flowered hemp-nettle - widespread across much of Europe and Asia; naturalized in North America
 Galeopsis × carinthiaca Porsch ex Fiori - Italy, Czech Republic (G. bifida × G. pubescens)
 Galeopsis × haussknechtii Ludw. - Czech Republic (G. ladanum × G. segetum)
 Galeopsis ladanum L. - widespread across much of Europe and Asia; naturalized in scattered sites in North America
 Galeopsis × ludwigii Hausskn. - Germany, Czech Republic (G. bifida × G. tetrahit)
 Galeopsis nana Otsch. - Caucasus (Georgia, Armenia, Azerbaijan)
 Galeopsis × polychroma Beck - Austria, Italy, Czech Republic, Baltic Republics (G. pubescens × G. speciosa)
 Galeopsis pubescens Besser – hairy or downy hempnettle - southern + central Europe from Britain and France east to Russia
 Galeopsis pyrenaica Bartl. - Pyrenees Mountains of Spain + France
 Galeopsis reuteri Rchb.f. - Alps of France + Italy
 Galeopsis segetum Neck. – downy hemp-nettle - Britain, Denmark, Netherlands, Belgium, France, Spain, Germany, Italy, Switzerland, Yugoslavia 
 Galeopsis speciosa Mill. – large-flowered hemp-nettle, Edmonton hempnettle - northern + central Europe, Siberia; naturalized in Canada
 Galeopsis tetrahit L. – common hemp-nettle, brittlestem hempnettle - southern + central Europe from Portugal to Russia; naturalized in New Zealand and North America
 Galeopsis × wirtgenii F.Ludw. ex Briq. - France, Czech Republic

References

 
Lamiaceae genera
Medicinal plants
Taxa named by Carl Linnaeus